Mei Wen (born 1965) is a vice admiral in the People's Liberation Army of China who is the current deputy political commissar of the Eastern Theater Command and political commissar of the Eastern Theater Command Navy.

Biography
Mei was born in Huangmei County, Hubei, in 1965. He enlisted in the People's Liberation Army (PLA) during university in 1985. After graduated from Dalian Naval Academy, he was assigned to the South Sea Fleet (now Southern Theater Command Navy).

He was appointed political commissar of the Chinese aircraft carrier Liaoning on 25 September 2012. In March 2022, he was commissioned as deputy political commissar of the Eastern Theater Command and political commissar of the Eastern Theater Command Navy.

He was promoted to the rank of rear admiral (shaojiang) in July 2017 and vice admiral (zhongjiang) in June 2022.

References

1965 births
Living people
People from Huangmei County
Dalian Naval Academy alumni
People's Liberation Army generals from Hubei
People's Republic of China politicians from Hubei
Chinese Communist Party politicians from Hubei